Sidnei Rechel da Silva Júnior (born 23 August 1989), known simply as Sidnei, is a Brazilian professional footballer who plays as a centre-back for Spanish club UD Las Palmas.

Club career

Internacional
Born in Alegrete, Rio Grande do Sul, Sidnei started playing professionally with Sport Club Internacional, being part of the side that conquered the 2007 edition of the Recopa Sudamericana. On 24 July 2008 he signed a five-year contract with S.L. Benfica, who paid €5 million for 50% of his sporting rights.

Benfica
Sidnei was used intermittently during his first season in Portugal, but still managed to appear in 24 Primeira Liga games and score three goals in as many wins, including the 2–0 derby home win against Sporting CP on 27 September 2008. In November, Benfica bought another 50% of his rights for €2 million, and GestiFute acquired the rights to receive 30% from any future transfer. He played only five league matches the following campaign – ten competitive appearances – as the club won the national championship after a five-year wait.

After spending the first half of 2010–11 on the bench, Sidnei was propelled to the starting XI after David Luiz moved to Chelsea in the winter transfer window. On 21 February 2011, he was sent off in a league game at Sporting but his team still managed to win it 2–0 and, later the following month, he renewed his contract for a further three seasons until 2016; however, due to poor performances, he lost his starting place to Jardel.

In early June 2011, Beşiktaş J.K. agreed with Benfica on a one-year loan, with the option to make the move permanent. On 19 September he scored a brace for the first in his career, helping to a 3–1 Süper Lig home victory over MKE Ankaragücü.

As the Turkish club opted against exercising its option, Sidnei returned to Portugal and found himself demoted to the B team. On 29 July 2013, he and Pizzi were loaned to La Liga's RCD Espanyol on a one-year deal.

Deportivo
On 1 September 2014, Sidnei moved to fellow league side Deportivo de La Coruña also on loan. After making 32 appearances to help his team avoid relegation, his loan was extended for a further year.

Sidnei had a contract running until 2018, with the Galicians sharing his rights with Benfica and GestiFute. He scored his first goal in the Spanish top division on 5 December 2016, helping the hosts rout Real Sociedad 5–1.

On 19 July 2018, Deportivo announced they had reached an agreement with FC Krasnodar over the transfer of Sidnei. The deal was called off two days later, however, with the player having been unable to agree terms.

Betis
In August 2018, Sidnei joined Real Betis also from the Spanish top flight on a four-year contract. On 31 August 2021, after 64 official matches, the 32-year-old terminated his contract with the club.

Cruzeiro and Goiás
On 13 December 2021, Sidnei returned to his home country after nearly 14 years, signing for Cruzeiro Esporte Clube. The following 25 March he terminated his contract and joined Goiás Esporte Clube, but also left the latter on 5 July having totalled just seven appearances for both sides.

Las Palmas
Sidnei returned to Spain in July 2022, agreeing to a one-year deal at second-tier UD Las Palmas.

Career statistics

Honours
Internacional
Recopa Sudamericana: 2007
Campeonato Gaúcho: 2008

Benfica
Primeira Liga: 2009–10
Taça da Liga: 2008–09, 2010–11

References

External links

1989 births
Living people
People from Alegrete
Sportspeople from Rio Grande do Sul
Brazilian footballers
Association football defenders
Campeonato Brasileiro Série A players
Campeonato Brasileiro Série B players
Sport Club Internacional players
Cruzeiro Esporte Clube players
Goiás Esporte Clube players
Primeira Liga players
Liga Portugal 2 players
S.L. Benfica footballers
S.L. Benfica B players
Süper Lig players
Beşiktaş J.K. footballers
La Liga players
RCD Espanyol footballers
Deportivo de La Coruña players
Real Betis players
UD Las Palmas players
Brazil youth international footballers
Brazilian expatriate footballers
Expatriate footballers in Portugal
Expatriate footballers in Turkey
Expatriate footballers in Spain
Brazilian expatriate sportspeople in Portugal
Brazilian expatriate sportspeople in Turkey
Brazilian expatriate sportspeople in Spain